Helmut Dietz (born 26 January 1965) is a German former judoka. He competed in the men's extra-lightweight event at the 1988 Summer Olympics.

References

External links
 

1965 births
Living people
German male judoka
Olympic judoka of West Germany
Judoka at the 1988 Summer Olympics
People from Kelheim (district)
Sportspeople from Lower Bavaria
20th-century German people